Marinus "Rinus" David  Israël (born 19 March 1942) is a Dutch former professional football player and manager who is currently a scout. Nicknamed "Iron Rinus", he formed a solid defence line at Feyenoord with Theo Laseroms.

Club career 
During his career he played for DWS (1962–66), Feyenoord Rotterdam (1966–74), Excelsior Rotterdam (1974–75) and PEC Zwolle (1975–82). Israël achieved his greatest success at club level with Feyenoord, where he won three Eredivisie titles, a KNVB Cup, a European Cup and a UEFA Cup. He scored one of the two Feyenoord's goals in the 1970 European Cup Final against Celtic.

International career 
He also played 47 matches and scored 3 goals for the Netherlands national football team from 1964 to 1974, and he played three matches for Holland in the 1974 FIFA World Cup, including the Second round victories against Brazil and Argentina.

Honours

Player 
DWS
Eredivisie: 1963–64
Feijenoord
Eredivisie: 1968–69, 1970–71, 1973–74
KNVB Cup: 1968–69
Intercontinental Cup: 1970
European Cup: 1969–70
UEFA Cup: 1973–74

Individual
Dutch Footballer of the Year: 1970, 1975

Manager 
Al-Wahda FC
UAE League: 2000–01
ADO Den Haag
Eerste Divisie: 2002–03

References 

1942 births
Living people
Dutch footballers
Dutch football managers
Dutch expatriate football managers
Netherlands international footballers
1974 FIFA World Cup players
Eredivisie managers
Eredivisie players
Eerste Divisie players
Feyenoord players
ADO Den Haag managers
PAOK FC managers
Feyenoord managers
AFC DWS players
Excelsior Rotterdam players
PEC Zwolle players
PEC Zwolle managers
Footballers from Amsterdam
Expatriate football managers in Ghana
Expatriate football managers in Greece
Expatriate football managers in the United Arab Emirates
Ghana national football team managers
Al Jazira Club managers
Al Shabab Al Arabi Club managers
1998 African Cup of Nations managers
UEFA Champions League winning players
UEFA Cup winning players
Association football defenders